Anuranan (English: Resonance) is the directorial debut by Bengali filmmaker Aniruddha Roy Chowdhury. The film premiered at the 2006 International Film Festival of India.

Anuranan (meaning  "resonance" in Bengali) explores the relationships of two married couples, and the impacts and consequences of their relationships.

Synopsis
Rahul, a creative and sensitive individual, arrives at a lonely hill station in Sikkim to help build a new holiday resort. The friendship between the two couples, Rahul and Nandita and Amit and Preeti, paves the way for a deeper bond between Rahul and Preeti. Towards the end of the movie, this "anuranan" between the two is misunderstood by society, including Amit. This misunderstanding intensifies when Rahul suddenly dies, leaving Nandita lonely. The fact that the love between Rahul and Nandita was pure does not prevent Nandita from falling prey to the rumors as well. All the four main characters are depicted as lost and lonely.

Awards and prizes
2008 – 54th (Indian) National Film Awards, Winner (Best Feature Film in Bengali)
2008 – Santa Cruz Film Festival, Emerging Filmmaker Award (Aniruddha Roy-Choudhury)

Cast
Rahul Bose as Rahul
Rituparna Sengupta as Nandita
Raima Sen as Preeti
Rajat Kapoor as Amit
 Haradhan Bandopadhyay as Nandita's Father
 Dolly Basu as Preeti's mother
 Mithu Chakraborty as Nandita's sister
 Barun Chanda as Mr Guha
Jacqui Dawson as Roda
Laura Price as Victoria
Peter Wear as Rahul's boss in London

Production
The film was shot on location in India and the UK. Director Aniruddha Roy-Chowdhury describes the scenery of the hill station in the mountains as making the Kanchenjunga "the third character" in the movie.

Songs
The film features music composed by tabla player Tanmoy Bose.
"Yeh Gagin" – Rituparna Sengupta, Rahul Bose, Rashid Khan, Anushua Chowdhurry
"Bahi Bahikisi" – Rajarshi Chatterjee
"Mere Pritam" – Kartik Das Baul

References

External links
 

Telegraph India Interview with Rajat Kapoor

Bengali-language Indian films
2006 films
Films set in Kolkata
Films shot in Sikkim
Best Bengali Feature Film National Film Award winners
2000s Bengali-language films
2006 directorial debut films
Films directed by Aniruddha Roy Chowdhury